Kiss of Death is a 1995 American crime thriller film directed and produced by Barbet Schroeder and starring David Caruso, Samuel L. Jackson, Nicolas Cage, Helen Hunt, Ving Rhames, and Stanley Tucci.

The film is a remake of the 1947 film noir classic of the same name that starred Victor Mature, Brian Donlevy, and Richard Widmark. It was screened out of competition at the 1995 Cannes Film Festival. Like the original Kiss of Death, the film was released by 20th Century Fox.

Plot

Jimmy Kilmartin is an ex-con living in Astoria in the New York City borough of Queens, trying to stay clean and raising a daughter with his wife Bev. They are both recovering alcoholics. Bev leaves Jimmy alone to go to an AA meeting. While she is gone, Jimmy is awakened by his cousin Ronnie who is in desperate need of a driver to help him move some stolen cars. Jimmy tries to eject Ronnie, knowing that he could go back to prison just for being seen with him. Ronnie's right ring finger is broken, and he confesses that if Jimmy does not help him move the cars, Little Junior Brown will kill him.

Little Junior Brown is an asthmatic psychopath. Enraged that they are so behind schedule, he insists that Ronnie move the four trucks full of stolen cars in a caravan, instead of staggering them to avoid detection. The caravan draws the attention of the police, and when they arrive at the Brooklyn Navy Yard to unload the cars, the police arrive. During the arrests, Jimmy's passenger shoots at the police. The bullet goes through Jimmy's hand and just below the right eye of Detective Calvin Hart.

The lawyer for the Brown crime family, Jack Gold, promises Jimmy that Bev will be taken care of if he takes the rap without naming his co-conspirators. Ronnie shorts Bev on her allowance, giving her only $150 of the $400 a week that the Browns intended for her. Bev agrees to work for Ronnie at his chop shop just south of Shea Stadium. On her first day, she witnesses Ronnie beating a man who tried to sell him a stolen car. She drinks a Rolling Rock, and goes with Ronnie to Baby Cakes, the strip club owned by the Browns. There Ronnie plies her with more alcohol and tries to take advantage of her. Big Junior and Little Junior are angered and instruct him to take her home but instead he brings her back to his house. Bev is horrified at her relapse and Ronnie's advances, so she rushes out of Ronnie's house and steals his car. She drives head-on into a semi-truck in the street and is killed instantly.

Given a supervised release for her funeral, Jimmy listens to Ronnie's lame explanation for why Bev died in his car. Bev's sister Rosie explains that she never returned home the night before her death. Convinced of Ronnie's complicity in Bev's death, Jimmy agrees to turn state's witness. He names all of the people involved in the Navy Yards fiasco, except Ronnie. When the cops arrest everyone but Ronnie, the Browns are convinced that he is the snitch. Little Junior Brown beats Ronnie to death in his office as retaliation.

Several years pass, and the district attorney approaches Jimmy again about snitching on the Browns. Still in Sing Sing, Jimmy negotiates for a pardon and a job that he would enjoy. He and Rosie get married, but he hides his informant duties from her.

Det. Hart meets with Jimmy at a Chinese restaurant and informs him that his target is actually a drug dealer named Omar, who gets weapons and cars from Little Junior Brown. Jimmy dons a wire and returns to work for the Browns with an initial assignment of boosting cars. After their rounds, Jimmy's crew heads to Baby Cakes where he sees Little Junior for the first time in years. Little Junior is distraught over the recent death of his father, and he offers Jimmy his condolences over Bev's death. Little Junior takes Jimmy to a meeting with Omar.

Jimmy is unable to sustain the charade with Rosie. Eventually, Little Junior takes Jimmy to another meeting with Omar, whom he kills. Later, Omar's crew throws Jimmy into a car and drives him to a meeting, where he learns that Omar was an undercover DEA agent. The DA and the DEA use Jimmy's tape of the killing to arrest Little Junior. When Little Junior is out on bail, he abducts Jimmy's daughter to send him a message. He eventually finds his daughter in the woods, with the letters B.A.D. (Balls, Attitude, Direction; an acronym Little Junior gives himself in a private moment with Jimmy) written on her forehead in blood.

Realizing that his family is not safe anymore, Jimmy returns to the city and confronts Little Junior at gunpoint at Baby Cakes. A fight ensues with Little Junior and Jimmy, which results in Little Junior being arrested by Det. Hart (after learning that Jimmy was wired). Jimmy uses a tape of the DA's corrupt threats as leverage to escape the situation. The final scene shows Jimmy getting into a stolen Explorer that Little Junior gave him, and he leaves the city with Rosie and his daughter.

Cast
 David Caruso as Jimmy Kilmartin
 Samuel L. Jackson as Detective Calvin Hart
 Nicolas Cage as Junior "Little Junior" Brown
 Helen Hunt as Beverly "Bev" Kilmartin
 Ving Rhames as FBI Agent Omar
 Stanley Tucci as District Attorney Frank Zioli
 Kathryn Erbe as Rosie D'Amico-Kilmartin
 Michael Rapaport as Ronnie Gannon
 Philip Baker Hall as Junior "Big Junior" Brown
 Anthony Heald as Attorney Jack Gold
 Lindsay J. Wrinn as Corinna Kilmartin As A Toddler
 Megan L. Wrinn as Corinna Kilmartin As A Toddler
 Katie Sagona as Corinna Kilmartin, 4 Years Old
 Angel David as J.J.
 John Costelloe as Detective Cleary
 Anne Meara as Bev's Mother
 Kevin Corrigan as Kid Selling Stolen Infinity
 Hope Davis as Junior's Girlfriend
 Jason Andrews as Johnny "Johnny A" Amato
 Sean G. Wallace as Bobby "Bobby B" Bannion
 Frank DiLeo as Big Junior's Friend
 Tony Cucci as Little Junior's Crew #1
 Allen K. Berstein as Little Junior's Crew #2
 Jose De Soto as J.J.'s Crew
 Debra J. Pereira as Sioux Dancer
 Bernadette Penotti as Molested Dancer
 Edward McDonald as US Attorney
 Mark Hammer as Judge 
 Joe Pentangelo as Riker's Prison Guard
 Joe Lisi as FBI Agent At Bungalow
 Shiek Mahmud-Bey as FBI Agent
 John C. Vennema as Angry FBI Agent
 Ed Trucco as Calvin's Partner
 Paul Calderon as Undercover FBI Agent (uncredited)
 Jay O. Sanders as Senior FBI Agent (uncredited)

Reception
Kenneth Turan of the Los Angeles Times called Cage "one of the few American actors who gets more interesting from film to film", adding that he "comes close to kidnapping the picture as Little Junior, a pumped-up but asthmatic thug who, like King Kong, is a gorilla with a wistful air about him."  Writing in the Chicago Sun-Times, Roger Ebert found the film uncompelling, awarding it only 2 out of 4 stars. Though he also considered the character of Little Junior "overwritten", Ebert did praise Nicolas Cage's performance, calling Cage a "real movie actor" who "plays the role with style and bravado."  The Washington Post wrote that Cage "dominates the camera, stealing scenes by the sheer intensity of his inimitable strangeness" and makes the film "worth seeing".  Todd McCarthy of Variety described it as "a very loose remake" and "crackling thriller" that is most notable for Cage's performance.  Janet Maslin of The New York Times wrote, "In Kiss of Death [Caruso] becomes a movie star with a vengeance, the kind of movie star he was meant to be."

The film holds a 68% approval rating on Rotten Tomatoes based on 40 reviews. The site's consensus reads: "An outstanding ensemble cast propels Kiss of Death, a noir-ish crime thriller that's slick and big on atmosphere, even if its script may only provide sporadic bursts of tension."

Audiences polled by CinemaScore gave the film an average grade of "B−" on an A+ to F scale.

David Caruso was nominated for a Razzie Award for Worst New Star for his work in both this movie and Jade, but lost to Elizabeth Berkley for Showgirls.

References

External links
 
 
 
 
 
 

1995 films
1990s crime drama films
1995 crime thriller films
American neo-noir films
American crime drama films
American crime thriller films
Remakes of American films
Films set in New York City
20th Century Fox films
Films with screenplays by Richard Price (writer)
Films directed by Barbet Schroeder
Films produced by Barbet Schroeder
Films scored by Trevor Jones
1995 drama films
1990s English-language films
1990s American films